Owen Lane (born 20 December 1997) is a Wales international rugby union player who plays for Cardiff Rugby as a centre or wing.

Lane made his debut for Cardiff in 2016 having previously played for their academy.

International

In April 2019 Lane was called up to the preliminary squad for Wales for the 2019 Rugby World Cup. 
Lane made his debut for Wales 31 August 2019 in the starting line up for the world cup warm up match versus Ireland, scoring a try. On 22 October 2019 Lane was called into the Wales world cup squad, replacing the injured Josh Navidi.

International tries

References

External links 
Cardiff Rugby profile

Rugby union players from Cardiff
Welsh rugby union players
Wales international rugby union players
Cardiff Rugby players
Living people
1997 births
Rugby union wings